Whatfix is a SaaS based platform which provides in-app guidance and performance support for web applications and software products. Whatfix helps companies to create interactive walkthroughs that appear within web applications.

Whatfix has offices in San Jose, California and Bengaluru, India.

History 
Cofounders Khadim Batti and Vara Kumar initially developed a search and social media engagement platform for SMBs. The product then pivoted to an interactive guidance platform for enterprises called Whatfix. Currently, Whatfix helps companies increase user adoption of the applications they use while also providing performance support. Whatfix also has a free community version where individuals can create interactive walkthroughs on websites and applications and share them publicly.

In January 2018, the company announced that Vispi Daver, a veteran Silicon Valley investor who has invested in Parature, Revionics, MakeMyTrip among others, joined the executive team. He was already on the Board of the company.

In October 2019, Whatfix acquired Airim to offer the Industry’s first autonomous personalization platform for the Digital Adoption solutions category.

In August 2021, Whatfix announced the acquisition of Nittio Learn, a learning management system.

In April 2022, Whatfix acquired Leap.is, a mobile assistance platform.

Funding 
In April, 2015, Whatfix raised $1 million in seed funding. The round was led by US-based venture capital firm Powerhouse Ventures, startup accelerator GSF and other Silicon Valley-based angel investors.

In April, 2017, Whatfix raised $3.7 million in Series A funding.

In March, 2019, Whatfix raised $12.5 million in Series B funding. EightRoads had led the round with participation of Cisco and existing investors Helion Venture Partners and Stellaris Venture Partners.

In February 2020, Whatfix raised $32 million in Series C funding. Sequoia Capital India led the round with participation from existing investors EightRoads, Cisco and F-Prime Capital.

In June 2021, Whatfix raised $90 million in Series D funding, tripling its valuation since the last funding in 2020. SoftBank Vision Fund 2 led the round, with participation from EightRoads, Sequoia Capital India, Dragoneer Investment Group, F-Prime Capital and Cisco.

In July 2021, Whatfix implemented an employee stock ownership plan (ESOP) buyback of $4.3 million (Rs.32 crores) for its employees.

Product 
Whatfix's platform provides product adoption, user onboarding, employee training, self-service support and performance support for companies using enterprise web applications. The platform allows SaaS application users to create interactive walkthroughs, or in-app guidance flows, that can lead users through a task on the application.

Whatfix has obtained ISO 27001:2013 certification as well as being SCORM 1.2 and DITA compliant. Whatfix is available as a paid Business version as well as a free version. Whatfix is most commonly used on platforms like Salesforce, SAP SuccessFactors, Oracle Cloud, Workday, SharePoint, Apttus etc.

Whatfix has also obtained SOC 2 certification.

References 

 
 

Companies based in San Jose, California
Web software
Cloud applications